Andy or Andrew Sullivan may refer to: 
 Andy Sullivan (baseball) (1884–1920), Major League Baseball player
 Andy Sullivan (golfer) (born 1987), English golfer
 Andrew Sullivan (born 1963), British-American writer, editor and blogger
 Andrew Sullivan (basketball) (born 1980), British basketball player
 Andrew Sullivan (politician), American politician in Wisconsin
 Andi Sullivan (born 1995), American soccer player